Paippad  is a village in Kottayam district in the state of Kerala, India.

Demographics
 India census, Paippad had a population of 19,281 with 9,475 males and 9,806 females. Paippad is also famous for being the second largest residential space for north Indian migrant workforce after Ernakulam.

References

External links 
 Paippad.com More about Paippad village and places
 Paippad Puthenkavu Bhagavathi Temple

Villages in Kottayam district
Changanassery